McAlevey is a surname. Notable people with the surname include:

Jane McAlevey (born 1964), American labor unionist
Lynn McAlevey (born 1953), New Zealand cricketer
Thomas McAlevey (born 1958), American chief executive

See also
McAlevey Gold Cup, a former greyhound racing competition held in Belfast, Northern Ireland